Nauris Miezis (born 31 March 1991) is a Latvian basketball player for the Latvian 3x3 national team.

He represented Latvia at the 2020 Summer Olympics. and was one of the four players in the team which won the gold medal by defeating the Russian Olympic Committee team 21 to 18.

References

External links

1991 births
Living people
3x3 basketball players at the 2020 Summer Olympics
Guards (basketball)
Latvian men's basketball players
Latvian men's 3x3 basketball players
Medalists at the 2020 Summer Olympics
Olympic gold medalists for Latvia
Olympic medalists in 3x3 basketball
Olympic 3x3 basketball players of Latvia
People from Ķekava Municipality